"Sorcerer" is a 1984 song written by the American singer/songwriter Stevie Nicks. It was written in 1972 during her time with Buckingham Nicks. The song was produced by Jimmy Iovine and given to Marilyn Martin for her contribution to the 1984 soundtrack album Streets of Fire.

Personnel
Marilyn Martin – vocals
Stevie Nicks, Sharon Celani, Lori Nicks – backing vocals
Billy Payne – piano
Waddy Wachtel – guitar
Russ Kunkel – drums
Kenny Edwards – bass

Stevie Nicks version

In 2001, Stevie Nicks released her own version of "Sorcerer" on her album Trouble in Shangri-La. This version peaked at #21 on the U.S. Billboard Adult Contemporary chart in 2001.

2001 Personnel
Stevie Nicks – vocals, keyboards
Sheryl Crow – guitar, backing vocals, producer
Sharon Celani – backing vocals
Lori Nicks – backing vocals
Matt Chamberlain – drums
Tim Smith – bass guitar
Pete Stroud – bass guitar
Jeff Trott – guitar

Charts

Notes and references

''Crystal Visions – The Very Best of Stevie Nicks, liner notes and commentary
http://rockalittle.com/offtherecord.htm
http://www.allmusic.com/album/street-angel-mw0000101506

Stevie Nicks songs
2001 singles
2001 songs
MCA Records singles
Reprise Records singles